This is an incomplete list of lighthouses in Turkey.

Black Sea
Anadolu Feneri, Istanbul Province
İnceburun Lighthouse, Sinop Province
İnebolu Feneri, Kastamonu Province
Gerze Feneri, Sinop Province
İğneada Feneri, Kırklareli Province
Kefken Adası Feneri, Kocaeli Province
Kerempe Feneri, Kastamonu Province
Rumeli Feneri, Istanbul Province
Şile Feneri, Istanbul Province

Sea of Marmara
Ahırkapı Feneri, Istanbul
Kadıköy İnciburnu Feneri, Istanbul
Fenerbahçe Feneri, Istanbul
Hoşköy Hora Feneri, Tekirdağ Province
Maiden's Tower, Istanbul
Yeşilköy Feneri, Istanbul

Aegean Sea
Babakale Feneri, Çanakkale Province|
Datça Feneri, Muğla Province
Knidos Deveboynu Feneri, Muğla Province
Kuşadası Feneri, Aydın Province
Sarpıncık Feneri, Izmir Province

Mediterranean Sea
Gelidonya Feneri, Antalya Province
Hıdırlık Tower, Antalya
Kemer Feneri, Antalya Province
Kızılada Lighthouse, Kızılada, Fethiye, Muğla Province
Mersin Feneri, Mersin Province

See also
 Lists of lighthouses and lightvessels

References

Further reading

External links

 
Pictures of some lighthouses in Turkey

Turkey
 
Lighthouses
Turkey transport-related lists